Baptism is a black metal band from Finland. The band was formed in 1998 by vocalist/guitarist Lord Sargofagian and drummer Demonium. The summer of that year the band released their first demo, Satanic Rituals, although very few copies were released. Following a two-year hiatus the band released their second demo, Sons of Ruin & Terror, in 2000. Similar to the last demo the release was limited. After the addition of bassist Slaughterer the band released their first full-length album, The Beherial Midnight, on June 12, 2002. The band release three more albums in 2004; a split CD with Uncreation's Dawn, and the EPs Wisdom & Hate and Black Ceremony. Slaughterer and Demonium left the band following the release of Wisdom & Hate, leaving Lord Sargofagian as the only official member. The band has continued with various session musicians, and have released four more full-length albums.

Members

Current
Lord Sargofagian – vocals, all instruments (Valonsurma, Calvarium, Black Death Ritual, ex-Behexen (live), ex-Ravine, ex-Satanic Warmaster, ex-Trotzreich, ex-Uncreation's Dawn, ex-Horna, ex-Ymir)

Live members
sg.7 – guitar, vocals (clean) (Horna, Darkwoods My Betrothed, Trollheim's Grott, Black Death Ritual, Slave's Mask, ex-Turmion Kätilöt, Prevalent Resistance)
TG – lead guitar (True Black Dawn, Trollheim's Grott, ex-Steep)
Syphon – bass (True Black Dawn, O, ex-...And Oceans, ex-Deathbound)
LRH – drums (Horna, Black Death Ritual, Darkwoods My Betrothed, Deathchain, Forgotten Horror, Trollheim's Grott, Chamber of Unlight, Demilich (live), Demonic Christ (live))

Former
Slaughterer – bass (2001-2003)
Demonium – drums (1998-2003)
Kobalt – drums (live) (2004-2007) (Devilry)
Cinatas – bass (live) (2004-2007) (IC Rex)
SDS – guitar (live) (2004-2007)
M. – bass (live) (2007-2011) (Sargeist)

Discography

Full-length albums
 The Beherial Midnight (2002)
 Morbid Wings of Sathanas (2005)
 Grim Arts of Melancholy (2008)
 As Darkness Enters (2012)
 V: The Devil's Fire (2016)

EPs
 Wisdom & Hate (2004)
 Black Ceremony (2004)
 Evil Mysteries (2006)
 Chalice of Death (2010)

Demos
 Satanic Rituals (1998)
 Sons of Ruin & Terror (2000)

Splits
 Primitive Finland (2003)
 Baptism / Uncreation's Dawn (2004)

Compilations
 Gloria Tibi Satana (2015)

References

External links
 Baptism at Encyclopaedia Metallum
 
 

Finnish black metal musical groups
Finnish heavy metal musical groups
Musical groups established in 1998
Finnish musical trios
1998 establishments in Finland
Season of Mist artists